734 Benda (prov. designation:  or ) is a large background asteroid from the outer regions of the asteroid belt, approximately  in diameter. It was discovered by Austrian astronomer Johann Palisa at the Vienna Observatory on 11 October 1912. For its size, the dark X-type asteroid has a relatively short rotation period of 7.1 hours. It was named after the discoverer's wife, Anna Benda.

Orbit and classification 

Benda is a non-family asteroid of the main belt's background population when applying the hierarchical clustering method to its proper orbital elements. It orbits the Sun in the outer asteroid belt at a distance of 2.8–3.5 AU once every 5 years and 7 months (2,040 days; semi-major axis of 3.15 AU). Its orbit has an eccentricity of 0.10 and an inclination of 6° with respect to the ecliptic. The body's observation arc begins at the discovering Vienna Observatory on 23 February 1920, almost eight years after its official discovery observation.

Naming 

This minor planet was named by friends of the discoverer after Anna Benda, second wife of Johann Palisa, whom he married in 1902.

Physical characteristics 

Benda is an X-type asteroid in both the Tholen- and SMASS-like taxonomic variants of the Small Solar System Objects Spectroscopic Survey (S3OS2). In agreement with its low albedo (see below), this object has also been classified as a C-type and P-type asteroid.

Rotation period 

In October 2013, a rotational lightcurve of Benda was obtained from photometric observations over two nights by Robert Stephens at the Center for Solar System Studies  in California. Lightcurve analysis gave a well-defined rotation period of  hours with a brightness variation of  magnitude.

In August 1995, a first period of  hours was determined by Stefano Mottola. In March 2004, French amateur astronomer René Roy obtained a period of  hours with an amplitude of  magnitude from three nights of observations, while Robert K. Buchheim determined a period of  hours and an amplitude of  magnitude observing Benda over 10 nights at the Altimira Observatory  in November 2007. In September 2018, a collaboration of the Italian Amateur Astronomers Union reported a period of  hours with a brightness variation of  magnitude.

Diameter and albedo 

The Collaborative Asteroid Lightcurve Link derives a low albedo of 0.0387 and a diameter of 70.71 kilometers based on an absolute magnitude of 9.9.

These timed observations are taken when the asteroid passes in front of a distant star.

Notes

References

External links 
 Lightcurve Database Query (LCDB), at www.minorplanet.info
 Dictionary of Minor Planet Names, Google books
 Asteroids and comets rotation curves, CdR – Geneva Observatory, Raoul Behrend
 Discovery Circumstances: Numbered Minor Planets (1)-(5000) – Minor Planet Center
 
 

000734
Discoveries by Johann Palisa
Named minor planets
19121011